Pena ajena is a Mexican comedy streaming television series, based on the Spanish television series Vergüenza, created by Álvaro Fernández Armero and Juan Cavestany. It premiered on Pantaya on 19 May 2022 and stars Adrián Uribe and Mónica Huarte.

Premise 
Jesús (Adrián Uribe), is photographer for socialites and is married to Nuria (Mónica Huarte), who dreams of becoming a mom. Jesús and Nuria constantly find themselves in embarrassing situations and saying the wrong thing at the wrong time. However, they manage to save each other from awkward moments.

Cast 
 Adrián Uribe as Jesús
 Mónica Huarte as Nuria
 Dominika Paleta
 Angélica Germanetti
 Jorge Caballero
 Luz María Jerez
 Juan Carlos Colombo

Episodes

References

External links 
 

2022 Mexican television series debuts
Spanish-language television shows
2020s Mexican comedy television series